Mateusz Michalski may refer to:

 Mateusz Michalski (athlete), Polish Paralympic athlete
 Mateusz Michalski (swimmer), Polish Paralympic swimmer
Mateusz Michalski (footballer) (born 29 June 1991), Polish professional footballer 
Mateusz Michalski (ice hockey player) (born 29 July 1992), Polish international ice hockey player